

Duck Ponds is a locality in the Australian state of South Australia located on the Eyre Peninsula in the state's west about  west of the state capital of Adelaide, about  south of the municipal seat of Cummins and about  west of the city of Port Lincoln.

Its boundaries were created on 16 October 2003 for the "long established name."  On 22 December 2011, a portion was added to the adjoining locality of Tulka.

The Flinders Highway forms part of the locality's north-eastern boundary with the locality of Boston while the highway's heavy vehicle by-pass, the Western Approach Road, passes through the eastern side of the locality from the north-west on its way to the port facility in Port Lincoln.  The Eyre Peninsula Railway which also passes through Duck Ponds in an alignment similar to the by-pass road, forms part of its southern boundary and hosts two railway stations – Grantham in the south which was established as Five Mile Siding about 1942 and Ducks Ponds in the locality's centre which was established in 1911. The Port Lincoln Prison occupies land in the locality's north-east corner while the Kathai Conservation Park, a protected area, is located in its south-east corner.

Land use within Duck Ponds principally consists of agricultural activities such as broadacre cropping and grazing.  Land use is subject to statutory control in order to manage the aquifer system existing within Duck Ponds and adjoining localities.

The 2016 Australian census which was conducted in August 2016 reports that Duck Ponds had a population of 289 people.

Duck Ponds is located within the federal division of Grey, the state electoral district of Flinders and the local government area of the District Council of Lower Eyre Peninsula.

References

Eyre Peninsula
Towns in South Australia